Irene Clarin (born 16 May 1955 in Munich, Germany) is a German television and theatre actress.

Selected filmography
2006 Siska - Alibi für Tommi (TV movie)
2005 Siska - Das Gewissen des Mörders (TV movie)
2005 Siska - Keine andere Wahl (TV movie)
2004 Siska - Einfach nur sterben (TV movie)
2004 Die Hengstpararade
2004 Die Rosenheim-Cops (TV movie)
2004 Schlosshotel Orth  (TV movie)
2002 Siska - Hass macht blind (TV movie)
1977-2002 a lot of Derrick and The Old Fox episodes
1989-1990 Pfarrerin Lenau (TV movie)
1982-1987 Die Wiesingers (TV movie), as Therese Wiesinger

External links

Doris Mattes Agency Munich 

German television actresses
Actresses from Munich
1955 births
Living people
German stage actresses
20th-century German actresses
21st-century German actresses